Trippa alla Romana ("Roman tripe") is a traditional dish of the cuisine of Rome, Italy.

History
Once a popular dish among the poorest inhabitants of Rome, Trippa alla Romana is today a staple of Roman cuisine. It is part of quinto quarto (literally "the fifth quarter", or the offal of butchered animals)., a type of cuisine born from poor, peasant kitchens. Each animal was divided into quarters (quarti), The first quarter (primo quarto), consisted of the best cuts and these went to the nobility. The second quarter was for the clergy. The third quarter (terzo quarto) was for the bourgeois (or merchant) class, and the fourth quarter was for soldiers.  All that was leftover became quinto quarto and was distributed among the rest of the population.

It is an ancient recipe, traditionally prepared during the Saturday lunch, so much so that even today in the historic trattorias you can read the sign that reads "Sabato Trippa".

The recipe of Trippa alla Romana has also spread thanks to Elena Fabrizi, an admirer of the popular dish of the Roman tradition.

The dish is prepared with tripe, white onions, peeled tomatoes, carrots, white wine, Pecorino Romano cheese and pennyroyal leaves.

References

Offal
Beef dishes
Cuisine of Lazio